Mannapur is a village in the Koppal district in Karnataka state, India.

Demographics
Per the 2011 Census of India, Mannapur has a total population of 1108; of whom 542 are male and 566 female.

See also
Lakkundi
Halligudi
Kuknoor
Koppal

References

Villages in Koppal district